The Department of Administrative Services was an Australian government department that existed between December 1975 and December 1984. It was the second so-named Commonwealth department.

Scope
Information about the department's functions and/or government funding allocation could be found in the Administrative Arrangements Orders, the annual Portfolio Budget Statements and in the department's annual reports.

According to the Administrative Arrangements Order (AAO) made on 22 December 1975 (reproduced by the National Archives), the department dealt with:
Provision of accommodation, staff and other facilities for members of the Parliament other than in Parliament House 
Procurement and purchase of goods and services, as required, for Australian Government purposes 
Maintenance of stocks of any such goods 
Disposal of surplus goods Government transport and storage facilities in the States and storage and transport of goods in the ACT 
Advisory services on fire protection for Australian Government purposes in Australia 
Government publicity and information
Government printing, publishing and advertising 
Acquisition, leasing and disposal of land and property, including office accommodation, in Australia and overseas for Australian Government purposes 
Land, engineering and topographical surveys for Australian Government purposes 
Royal Commissions Matters relating to the Territory of Cocos (Keeling) Islands, the Territory of Christmas Island, Norfolk Island and the Coral Sea Island Territory 
National Museums 
National Archives 
Grants to national organisations 
Support for international conferences 
World expositions 
War graves 
Elections and referendums.

Structure
The department was an Australian Public Service department, staffed by officials who were responsible to the Minister for Administrative Services.

References

Ministries established in 1975
Administrative Services
1975 establishments in Australia
1984 disestablishments in Australia